Novokare (Beş-yurt) is a rural locality (a selo) in Babayurtovsky District, Republic of Dagestan, Russia. The population was 1,393 as of 2010. There are 23 streets. Selo was founded in 1954.

Geography
Novokare is located 26 km east of Babayurt (the district's administrative centre) by road. Tatayurt is the nearest rural locality.

References 

Rural localities in Babayurtovsky District